The 1904 Wimbledon Championships took place on the outdoor grass courts at the All England Lawn Tennis and Croquet Club in Wimbledon, London, United Kingdom. The tournament ran from 20 June until 29 June. It was the 28th staging of the Wimbledon Championships, and the first Grand Slam tennis event of 1904. The entry for the men's singles rose to 62, beating the 1880 record of 60. The balls and equipment were provided by Slazenger.

Finals

Men's singles

 Laurence Doherty defeated  Frank Riseley, 6–1, 7–5, 8–6

Women's singles

 Dorothea Douglass defeated  Charlotte Sterry 6–0, 6–3

Men's doubles

 Laurence Doherty /  Reginald Doherty defeated  Frank Riseley /  Sydney Smith, 6–1, 6–2, 6–4

References

External links
 Official Wimbledon Championships website

 
Wimbledon Championships
Wimbledon Championships
Wimbledon Championships